John Smith is a common personal name. It is also commonly used as a placeholder name and pseudonym, and is sometimes used in the United States and the United Kingdom as a term for an average person. It may refer to:

People
In chronological order.

Academics
John Smith (anatomist and chemist) (1721–1797), professor of anatomy and chemistry at the University of Oxford, 1766–1797
John Blair Smith (1764–1799), president of Union College, New York
John Smith (Cambridge, 1766), vice chancellor of the University of Cambridge, 1766 until 1767
John Smith (astronomer) (1711–1795), Lowndean Professor of Astronomy and Master of Caius
John Smith (lexicographer) (1752-1809), professor of languages at Dartmouth College
John Augustine Smith (1782–1865), president of the College of William and Mary, 1814–1826
John Smith (botanist) (1798–1888), curator of Kew Gardens
John Smith (physician) (c.1800–1879), Scottish physician specialising in treating the insane
John Alexander Smith (physician) (1818–1883), Scottish physician, antiquarian, archaeologist and ornithologist
J. Lawrence Smith (chemist) (1818–1883), American doctor and chemist
John Smith (dentist) (1825–1910), founder of Edinburgh's School of Dentistry
John Campbell Smith (1828–1914), Scottish writer, advocate and Sheriff-Substitute of Forfarshire
John Donnell Smith (1829–1928), biologist and taxonomist
John McGarvie Smith (1844–1918), Australian metallurgist and bacteriologist
John Bernhardt Smith (1858–1912), American entomologist
John Alexander Smith (1863–1939), British Idealist philosopher
John Maynard Smith (1920–2004), geneticist
John Cyril Smith (1922–2003), leading authority on English criminal law
John Derek Smith (1924–2003), Cambridge molecular biologist
John Smith (sociologist) (1927–2002), English sociologist
John D. Smith (born 1946), indologist at the University of Cambridge
John H. Smith (mathematician), Boston College educator (retired 2005)
John E. Sharwood Smith, English professor of classics
John Edwin Smith, American philosopher
John Merlin Powis Smith, English-born, American orientalist and biblical scholar

Arts
John Smith (engraver) (1652–1742), English mezzotint engraver
John Smith (English poet) (1662–1717), English poet and playwright
John Christopher Smith (1712–1795), English composer
John Warwick Smith (1749–1831), British watercolour landscape painter and illustrator
John Stafford Smith (1750–1836), composer of the tune for "The Star-Spangled Banner"
John Raphael Smith (1751–1812), English mezzotint engraver and painter
John Thomas Smith (engraver) (1766–1833), draughtsman, engraver and antiquarian
John Smith (clockmaker) (1770–1816), Scottish clockmaker
John Rubens Smith (1775–1849), London-born painter, printmaker and art instructor who worked in the United States
John Smith (architect) (1781–1852), Scottish architect
John Smith Murdoch (1862-1945), Scottish architect
John Smith (art historian) (1781–1855), British art dealer
John Orrin Smith (1799–1843), English wood engraver
John Frederick Smith (1806–1890), English novelist
John Rowson Smith (1810–1864), American panorama painter
John Kelday Smith (1834–1889), Scottish bellhanger and songwriter
John G. Smith (poet) (died 1891), Scottish poet
John Moyr Smith (1839–1912), British artist and designer
John Berryman (1914–1972), originally John Allyn Smith, American poet
John Smith (Canadian poet) (born 1927), Canadian poet
John Smith (actor) (1931–1995), American actor
John N. Smith (born 1943), Canadian film director and screenwriter
John Smith (English filmmaker) (born 1952), avant-garde filmmaker
John Warner Smith (born 1952), American poet and educator
John F. Smith, American soap opera writer and producer
John Smith (comics writer) (born 1967), British comics writer
John Smith (musician), English contemporary folk musician and recording artist
John F. Smith (musician) (born 1950), British musician and trade unionist
John Smith (comedian), British comedian, actor and performer

Business
John K. Smith (died 1845), founder of SmithKline as in GlaxoSmithKline, the leading pharmaceutical business
John Russell Smith (1810–1894), English bookseller and bibliographer
John J. Smith (1820–1906), African-American abolitionist, Underground Railroad contributor and politician
John Smith (brewer) (1824–1879), Tadcaster brewery founder in North Yorkshire, UK
John L. Smith (pharmaceutical executive) (1889–1950), German-born American chemist, pharmaceutical executive and Major League Baseball team owner
John F. Smith Jr. (born 1938), former chairman and chief executive officer, General Motors
John Smith (executive) (born 1957), former chief executive officer, BBC Worldwide Ltd

Crime
John Smith (housebreaker) (1661–after 1727), London housebreaker who evaded hanging thrice and was eventually transported to Virginia
John Smith (died 1835) (1795–1835), one of the last two Englishmen who were hanged for sodomy in 1835
John Eldon Smith (1930–1983), convicted of the murders of Ronald and Juanita Akins
John Smith (murderer) (born 1951), American convicted murderer who killed his first and second wives

Law
John Gordon Smith (surgeon) (1792–1833), Scottish surgeon and professor of medical jurisprudence
John Sidney Smith (legal writer) (1804–1871), English legal writer
John William Smith (legal writer) (1809–1845), English barrister and legal writer
John Smalman Smith, (1847-1914) British judge in the Colony of Lagos
John Lewis Smith Jr. (1912–1992), United States federal judge
John Smith (police officer) (born 1938), British police officer, Deputy Commissioner of the Metropolitan Police, 1991–1995

Military

John Smith (banneret) (1616–1644), Englishman who supported the Royalist cause in the English Civil War
John Smith (British Army officer, born 1754) (1754–1837), soldier in the American Revolutionary War
John Smith (naval officer) (1780–1815), United States Navy officer, who served during the First Barbary War and later in the War of 1812
Frederick Smith (British Army officer, born 1790) (John Mark Frederick Smith, 1790–1874), British general and colonel-commandant of the Royal Engineers
John Smith (sergeant) (1814–1864), soldier in the Bengal Sappers and Miners, and Indian Mutiny Victoria Cross recipient
John E. Smith (1816–1897), Swiss emigrant, Union general during the Civil War
John Smith (private) (1822–1866), soldier in the 1st Madras (European) Fusiliers and Indian Mutiny Victoria Cross recipient
John Smith (Medal of Honor, born 1826) (1826–1907), American Civil War sailor and Medal of Honor recipient
John Smith (Medal of Honor, born 1831) (1831–?), American Civil War sailor and Medal of Honor recipient
John Smith (Medal of Honor, born 1854) (1854–?), United States Navy sailor and Medal of Honor recipient
John Manners Smith (1864–1920), recipient of the Victoria Cross
John Smith (flying ace) (1914–1972), United States Marine Corps flying ace and Medal of Honor recipient

Politicians

Australia
John Smith (Victoria politician) (John Thomas Smith, 1816–1879), Mayor of Melbourne
John Smith (New South Wales politician, born 1811) (1811–1895), pastoralist and member of the New South Wales Legislative Council
John Smith (New South Wales politician, born 1821) (1821–1885), Scottish/Australian professor and member of the New South Wales Legislative Council
John Samuel Smith (1841–1882), pastoralist and member of the New South Wales Legislative Assembly (Wellington)
John Gordon Smith (politician) (1863–1921), member of the Queensland Legislative Council
John Henry Smith (politician) (1881–1953), member of the Legislative Assembly of Western Australia

Canada
John David Smith (1786–1849), businessman and political figure in Upper Canada
John Smith, 1800s Cree Chief and Treaty Six signatory; founder of the Muskoday First Nation in Saskatchewan
John Shuter Smith (c. 1813–1871), lawyer and political figure in Canada West
John Smith (Kent MPP), member of the 1st Ontario Legislative Assembly, 1867–1871
John Smith (Manitoba politician) (1817–1889), English-born farmer and politician in Manitoba
John Smith (Peel MPP) (1831–1909), Scottish-born Ontario businessman and political figure
John Smith (Ontario MP) (1894–1977), member of Canadian House of Commons, Lincoln electoral district
Jack Smith (politician) (John Eachern Smith, 1901–1967), Canadian politician and newspaper editor
John James Smith (1912–1987), member of Canadian House of Commons, Moose Mountain, Saskatchewan electoral district
John Donald Smith (1919–1997), Canadian politician in the Legislative Assembly of British Columbia
John Roxburgh Smith (1938–2018), Canadian politician in the Legislative Assembly of Ontario
John W. Y. Smith, member of the Legislative Assembly of New Brunswick

United Kingdom
John Smith alias Dyer (1498/99–1571), member of parliament (MP) for Ipswich
John Smith (High Sheriff of Kent) (1557–1608), MP for Aylesbury and Hythe
John Smith (steward of Berkeley) (1567–1640), English genealogical antiquary and politician who sat in the House of Commons, 1621–1622
Sir John Smith of Grothill (c. 1600 – c. 1675), 17th-century Scottish landowner, merchant and Lord Provost of Edinburgh
John Smith (Cavalier, born 1608) (1608–1657), English politician who sat in the House of Commons, 1640–1644
John Smith (Chancellor of the Exchequer) (1655/56–1723), English Chancellor of the Exchequer and Speaker of the House of Commons, 1705–1708
John Smith (judge) (1657–1726), Justice of Common Pleas in Ireland until 1702, then Baron of the Exchequer
John Smith (Bath MP) (1727–1775), MP for Bath
John Smith (Deputy Governor of Anguilla) (died 1776), Deputy Governor of Anguilla
John Smith (Wendover MP) (1767–1842), member of Parliament for Wendover
John Hilary Smith (born 1928), colonial governor and administrator
John Spencer Smith (1769–1845), British diplomat, politician and writer
John Benjamin Smith (1796–1879), British Liberal MP for Stirling Burghs 1847–1852 and Stockport 1852–1874
John Abel Smith (1802–1871), British Member of Parliament for Chichester and Midhurst
John Smith (Conservative politician) (1923–2007), MP for the Cities of London and Westminster, founded the Landmark Trust
John Smith, Baron Kirkhill (born 1930), life peer in the House of Lords
John Smith (Labour Party leader) (1938–1994), leader of the British Labour Party
John Smith (Welsh politician) (born 1951), Welsh politician and Labour Party member of Parliament

United States
John Smith (explorer) (1580–1631), helped found the Virginia Colony and became Colonial Governor of Virginia
John Smith (President of Rhode Island) (died 1663), colonial president (governor) of Rhode Island
John Smith (Virginia burgess) (1620–1663), Virginia colonial politician
John Smith (Ohio politician, died 1824) (c. 1735–1824), United States senator from Ohio
John Smith (Virginia representative) (1750–1836), United States representative from Virginia's 3rd Congressional District
John Smith (New York politician, born 1752) (1752–1816), United States senator from New York
John Cotton Smith (1765–1845), eighth Governor of Connecticut
John Smith (Vermont politician) (1789–1858), United States representative from Vermont's 4th Congressional District
John William Smith (politician) (1792–1845), Texas political figure and mayor of San Antonio, Texas
John Speed Smith (1792–1854), United States representative from Kentucky
John T. Smith (congressman) (1801–1864), United States representative from Pennsylvania's 3rd Congressional District, 1843–1845
John B. Smith (Wisconsin politician) (1811–1879), Wisconsin politician
John Derby Smith (1812–1884), minister, physician, and Massachusetts state legislator
J. Lawrence Smith (New York politician) (1816–1889), New York lawyer, assemblyman, district attorney, county judge
J. Gregory Smith (1818–1891), governor of Vermont
John Armstrong Smith (1814–1892), United States representative from Ohio
John Hugh Smith (1819–1870), three-time mayor of Nashville, Tennessee between 1845 and 1865
J. Hyatt Smith (1824–1886), United States representative from New York's 3rd Congressional District
John Quincy Smith (1824–1901), United States representative from Ohio's 3rd Congressional District
John Lyman Smith (1828–1898), member of the 2nd Utah Territorial Legislature
John Y. T. Smith (1831–1903), three time member of Arizona Territorial Legislature
John C. Smith (politician) (1832–1910), Lieutenant Governor of Illinois
John Montgomery Smith (1834–1903), Wisconsin politician
John B. Smith (Washington politician) (1837–1917), Canadian-born American politician in the state of Washington
John Butler Smith (1838–1914), 52nd Governor of New Hampshire
John E. Smith (New York politician) (1843–1907), New York politician
John Day Smith (1845-1933) Minnesota politician, lawyer, and judge
John Walter Smith (1845–1925), 44th Governor of Maryland
John Ambler Smith (1847–1892), United States representative from Virginia
John Peter Smith (1848–?), mayor of Missoula, Montana
John M. C. Smith (1853–1923), United States representative from Michigan's 3rd Congressional District
J. H. Smith (mayor) (1858–1956), mayor of Everett, Washington and co-founder of Anchorage, Alaska
John M. Smith (politician, born 1872) (1872–1947), American businessman and politician
John W. Smith (Detroit mayor) (1882–1942), politician from Detroit
John Lee Smith (1894–1963), Lieutenant Governor of Texas
John R. Smith (agriculture commissioner) (fl. 1898–1899), North Carolina politician
J. Joseph Smith (1904–1980), United States representative from Connecticut and Federal judge
J. Clay Smith Jr. (1942–2018), American lawyer and educator
John Arthur Smith (born 1942), Democratic member of the New Mexico Senate
John R. Smith (politician, born 1945), Louisiana state senator
John Robert Smith, mayor of Meridian, Mississippi
John Smith (Washington politician) (born 1973), American politician of the Republican Party
John A. Smith (Mississippi politician) (1847–?), American state senator in Mississippi
John P. Smith, general superintendent of the Long Island State Park Commission
John Smith (Maine politician), mayor of Saco, Maine
John Smith (miller), a founding settler of Providence Plantation (later Rhode Island)

Other countries
John Hope Smith (c. 1787–1831), governor of colonial Ghana, 1817–22
J. Valentine Smith (John Valentine Smith, 1824–1895), New Zealand politician

Religion
John Smith (bishop of Llandaff) (died 1479), Welsh bishop
John Smith (Platonist) (1618–1652), one of the founders of the Cambridge Platonists
John Smith (bishop of Killala and Achonry) (died 1680), Irish Anglican priest
John Smith (Unitarian) (fl. 1648–1727), Unitarian writer
John Smith (priest, born 1659) (1659–1715), English editor of Bede
John Smith (uncle of Joseph Smith) (1781–1854), Presiding Patriarch and member of the First Presidency of the Church of Jesus Christ of Latter-day Saints
"Raccoon" John Smith (Restoration Movement) (1784–1868), early Restoration Movement leader
John Smith (missionary) (1790–1824), English missionary in Demerara
John Smith (priest, born 1799) (1799–1870), first person to transcribe the Diary of Samuel Pepys
John Smith (nephew of Joseph Smith) (1832–1911), Presiding Patriarch of the Church of Jesus Christ of Latter-day Saints
John Henry Smith (1848–1911), apostle in the Church of Jesus Christ of Latter-day Saints
John Smith (moderator) (1854-1927), moderator of the General Assembly of the Church of Scotland in 1922
John Taylor Smith (1860–1938), Anglican bishop of Sierra Leone
John Smith (archdeacon of Llandaff), Welsh Anglican priest
John Smith (archdeacon of Wiltshire) (1933–2000), Anglican priest
John M. Smith (bishop) (1935–2019), American Roman Catholic bishop
John H. Smith (bishop) (1939–2012), American Episcopal prelate, Bishop of the Episcopal Diocese of West Virginia, 1989–1999
John Smith (God's Squad) (died 2019), Australian founder of the God's Squad motorcycle club

Sports

American football
John "Clipper" Smith (1904–1973), American football player and coach
John Smith (tackle), American football tackle
John L. Smith (born 1948), American college football coach
John Smith (placekicker) (born 1949), former New England Patriots kicker
John Smith (running back) (born 1954), former American football running back
J. T. Smith (American football) (John Thomas Smith, born 1955), former professional American football player
JuJu Smith-Schuster (John Smith-Schuster, born 1996), American football wide receiver

Association football
John Smith (sportsman, born 1855) (1855–1934), Scottish footballer and rugby union player
John Smith (footballer, born 1865) (1865–1911), Scottish footballer who played as a striker
Jack Smith (footballer, born 1898) (John William Smith, 1898–1977), English international footballer, played for South Shields and Portsmouth
John Smith (footballer, born 1898) (1898–?), Scottish footballer (Ayr United, Middlesbrough, Scotland)
John Richard Smith (footballer, born 1898) (1898–1986), English footballer
John Smith (footballer, born 1901), English footballer for Bradford City and Blackburn Rovers
John Smith (inside-left), English footballer 1932–33
John Smith (1930s footballer), footballer of the 1930s for (Gillingham)
Ted Smith (footballer, born 1914) (1914–1989), English football player and manager (birth name John Edward Smith)
John Smith (football chairman) (1920–1995), chairman of Liverpool (1973–90)
John Smith (footballer, born 1921) (born 1921), English footballer
John Smith (footballer, born 1927) (1927–2000), English footballer (Liverpool)
John Smith (footballer, born 1939) (1939–1988), West Ham United
John Smith (footballer, born 1944), Welsh footballer (Wrexham)
John Smith (footballer, born 1970), football full back (Tranmere Rovers)
John Smith (footballer, born 1971), English retired football striker

Baseball
John Smith (shortstop), shortstop, 1873–75
John Smith (1880s first baseman) (1858–1899), first baseman in 1882
Phenomenal Smith (John Francis Smith, 1864–1952), American baseball pitcher and manager
John Smith (1930s first baseman) (1906–1982), first baseman in 1931
John G. Smith (coach) (1924–1998), American college baseball, football and basketball coach
Ford Smith (John Ford Smith, 1919–1983), American Negro leagues pitcher

Basketball
John Smith (basketball, born 1944), former American basketball player known for his American Basketball Association career
John Smith (basketball, born 1969), American college basketball coach
John Smith (basketball, born 1984), former American basketball player best known for his college career at Winona State University

Cricket

John Smith (cricketer, born 1833) (1833–1909), Lancashire and Yorkshire cricketer
John Smith (cricketer, born 1835) (1835–1889), English cricketer
John Smith (Derbyshire cricketer) (1841–1898), English cricketer, played for Derbyshire
John Smith (cricketer, born 1843) (1843–1873), English cricketer, played for Cambridgeshire 1863–72
John Smith (cricketer, born 1882) (1882–1959), English cricketer, played for Leicestershire 1921
John Smith (cricketer, born 1919) (1919–1999), New Zealand cricketer
John Smith (cricketer, born 1924) (1924–1991), English cricketer, played for Leicestershire 1950–1955
John Smith (cricketer, born 1936) (1936-2020), Australian cricketer
John Smith (New Zealand cricketer) (born 1960), New Zealand cricketer also known as Campbell Smith

Rugby
John Sidney Smith (rugby union) (1860–?), Wales rugby union international
Johnny Smith (rugby union) (1922–1974), New Zealand rugby player, baker, soldier, and sportsman
John Smith (rugby league), New Zealand international
J. V. Smith (John Vincent Smith, 1926–2021), English rugby player and RFU president

Other sports
John Smith (Canadian rower) (1899–1973), Canadian rower at the 1924 Olympics
John Smith (Australian footballer) (born 1933), footballer for St Kilda
John Smith (Zambian wrestler) (born 1942), Zambian freestyle wrestler at the 1964 Olympics
John Smith (sprinter) (born 1950), former American sprint athlete and now coach
John Smith (American wrestler) (born 1965), American wrestler, two-time Olympic gold medalist
J.T. Smith (wrestler) (born 1967), American professional wrestler
John Smith (South African rower) (born 1990), South African rower at the 2012 Olympics
John Suttie Smith (1905–1975), Scottish Olympic runner

Other
Sir John Smith, 1st Baronet (1744–1807), baronet
John Kilby Smith (1752–1842), public servant from New England
John Smith (Chippewa Indian) (died 1922), reputed to have died at the age of 137
John Smith (abolitionist), 19th century American industrialist and abolitionist
John Chaloner Smith (1827–1895), Irish civil engineer and writer on mezzotints
John Brown Smith (1837–?), American author, shorthand developer, utopianist, tax resister
John Baptist Smith (1843–1923), invented and helped build a lantern system of naval signaling
J. E. Smith (c. 1862/1863–1912), English trade union leader
John Chabot Smith (1915–2002), American journalist and author
John Douglas Smith (born 1966), sound editor
John Henry Smith (reporter), American sports journalist, active 2000s
John Smith (Australian journalist), Australian journalist, winner of 2016 Kennedy Award

Fictional characters
Ranger Smith (John Francis Smith), a park ranger in Yogi Bear cartoons
J. Wesley Smith, a character in cartoons of Burr Shafer (1899–1965)
John Smith (Kyon), Kyon's alias in the novels and animations of the Haruhi Suzumiya series
John "Hannibal" Smith, a character in The A-Team
John Smith, the human identity of Red Tornado, a fictional superhero appearing in DC Comics
John Smith, also known as "Number Four", the protagonist of the young adult novel I Am Number Four
John Smith, the protagonist played by Bruce Willis in Last Man Standing (1996 film)
John Smith, the protagonist played by Brad Pitt in Mr. & Mrs. Smith
John Smith (Doctor Who), an alias of the Doctor in Doctor Who media
John Smith (Jericho), a character in the TV series Jericho
Agent Smith, also known as John Smith, the main villain in The Matrix franchise
John Smith, a Nazi  in the television series The Man in the High Castle, not appearing in the novel of the same name
 John Smith, the main villain played by Zachary Quinto, in the movie Hitman: Agent 47
Johnny Smith (Dead Zone), main character in Stephen King's novel The Dead Zone and its subsequent adaptations

See also
Joe Bloggs
John Doe
Sir John Smith (disambiguation)
John Smyth (disambiguation)
John Smythe (disambiguation)
Johnny Smith (disambiguation)
Jack Smith (disambiguation)
Jonathan Smith (disambiguation)
Jan Smit (disambiguation)
John Smit (born 1978), South African rugby player
Juan Smith (born 1981), South African rugby player
John Smith's Brewery, a brewery founded in 1758 by John Smith at Tadcaster in North Yorkshire, England
John Smith & Son, Glasgow-based bookseller
Ode to J. Smith, the Travis album written about John Smith, the unknown everyday man
Johann Schmidt (disambiguation)
Smith of Derby Group, group of clockmaking companies including John Smith & Sons